{{DISPLAYTITLE:C4H3F7O}}
The molecular formula C4H3F7O (molar mass: 200.055 g/mol, exact mass: 200.0072 u) may refer to:

 Sevoflurane
 Synthane

Molecular formulas